On June 9, 1996, while operating a passenger flight from Trenton, New Jersey to Richmond, Virginia, the crew of Eastwind Airlines Flight 517 temporarily lost control of their Boeing 737-200 because of a rudder malfunction. The crew were able to regain control and land the aircraft successfully. One flight attendant was injured.

Flight 517 was instrumental in resolving the cause of Boeing 737 rudder issues that had caused two previous fatal crashes because it was the first flight to experience such rudder issues and land safely, allowing investigators to interview the pilots about their experience and to study the aircraft.

Background

On March 3, 1991, United Airlines Flight 585, a Boeing 737-200, rolled to the right and went into a vertical dive while attempting to land in Colorado Springs, Colorado. The resulting crash killed all 25 people on board. The National Transportation Safety Board (NTSB) conducted a thorough investigation. Although a rudder problem was suspected, the aircraft's rudder components could not be tested or fully evaluated because they were severely damaged in the crash. As a result, the NTSB was unable to conclusively identify the cause of the crash.

On September 8, 1994, USAir Flight 427, a Boeing 737-300, abruptly rolled to the left while on approach to Pittsburgh International Airport in an accident very similar to that of Flight 585. The resulting crash killed all 132 people on board.  The NTSB's subsequent investigation persisted throughout the late 1990s.

Flight information
Flight 517 was a scheduled Eastwind Airlines passenger flight from Trenton-Mercer Airport in Trenton, New Jersey to Richmond International Airport in Richmond, Virginia. The flight was operated using a Boeing 737-200 (registration number N221US). On June 9, 1996, Flight 517 was operated by Captain Brian Bishop and First Officer Spencer Griffin. A total of 53 people were on board.

Incident
Flight 517 departed Trenton without incident and encountered no turbulence or unusual weather en route to Richmond.  While on approach to Richmond International Airport, at an altitude of about  MSL, the captain felt a brief "kick" or "bump" on the right rudder pedal. Around the same time, a flight attendant at the rear of the plane heard a thumping noise underneath her. As the plane continued to descend through , the captain suddenly experienced a loss of rudder control and the plane rolled sharply to the right.

Attempting to regain control, the captain tried to apply full left rudder, but the rudder controls were stiff and did not respond to his commands. He applied left aileron and increased power to the right engine to try to stop the roll. The airplane temporarily stabilized, and then rolled to the right again. The crew performed their emergency checklist and attempted to regain control of the aircraft, and after several seconds they abruptly regained control. The airplane operated normally for the remaining duration of the flight.

No damage occurred to the aircraft as a result of the incident. One flight attendant suffered minor injuries. No other passengers or crew aboard Flight 517 were injured.

Investigation and aftermath
The NTSB investigated the incident, with a particular focus on determining whether the events of Flight 517 were related to previous Boeing 737 crashes.

During the investigation, the NTSB found that prior to the June 9 incident, flight crews had reported a series of rudder-related events on the incident aircraft, including abnormal "bumps" on the rudder pedals and uncommanded movement of the rudder.

Investigators conducted interviews with the pilots of Flight 517, and removed rudder components from the aircraft for examination, which helped to establish the cause of the previous crashes of United Flight 585 and USAir Flight 427. The LINTS determined that all three incidents could be explained only by pilot error or a malfunction of the rudder system, and, based partly on post-accident interviews with the Flight 517 pilots, concluded that rudder malfunctions were likely to have caused all three incidents.

The NTSB also determined that, unlike the United or USAir accidents, the rudder problem on Flight 517 occurred earlier in the landing process and at a higher speed, which increased airflow over the other control surfaces of the aircraft, allowing the pilots to overcome the rudder-induced roll.

N221US was repaired and returned to service with Eastwind Airlines until the airline ceased operations in 1999. On July 17, 1996, N221US was operating as Eastwind Flight 507 to Trenton-Mercer Airport, when the flight crew witnessed the explosion and crash of TWA Flight 800 directly in front of them. Flight 507's crew were the first to report the accident to air traffic control. The aircraft was placed into storage at Indy South Greenwood Airport in 1999, and was scrapped in 2000.

Notes

References

Eastwind Airlines 517
Airliner accidents and incidents caused by design or manufacturing errors
Airliner accidents and incidents caused by mechanical failure
Aviation accidents and incidents in 1996
Airliner accidents and incidents in Virginia
Eastwind Airlines accidents and incidents
1996 in Virginia
June 1996 events in the United States